Mapúa Malayan Colleges Laguna (MMCL), formerly known as Malayan Colleges Laguna (MCL), is a private, research, and nonsectarian university wholly-owned subsidiary of the Mapúa University along Pulo–Diezmo Road in Barangay Diezmo, Cabuyao, Laguna. It was opened on June 18, 2006. MCL is close to the industrial hub of Laguna, giving students easy access to on-the-job training opportunities in prestigious companies.

MCL prides itself in its consistent string of successes over the years which include 100% passing rates in several licensure and certification examinations, topnotchers, and the exceptionally high employment rates of graduates – all of which have helped MCL secure its ranking as the number one private HEI (higher educational institution) in Calabarzon.

History

When the ownership of the Mapúa Institute of Technology (now Mapúa University) was transferred to the Yuchengco Group of Companies (YGC) under the stewardship of the honorable Ambassador Alfonso T. Yuchengco in the year 1999, a great amount of effort was put into improving the academic programs and facilities of the institution, thus raising Mapúa’s level to be at par with international standards.

Through the years, new programs such as Computer Science, Information Technology, Material Science and Engineering, Biological Engineering, Psychology, Accountancy, and Hotel and Restaurant Management have been added to Mapúa's offering of Engineering and Architecture programs. The expansion did not stop there, however. In fulfillment of the long-term development plan of Mapúa, a six-hectare land was acquired for its expansion and presence in Laguna, which stands as one of CALABARZON’s industrial and commercial hubs.

Groundwork started in late 2005, and on January 23, 2006, Malayan Colleges Laguna (MCL) acquired its corporate personality following its registration with the Securities and Exchange Commission.

This paved the way for the creation of an interim group geared to ensure the ultimate achievement of MCL’s vision and mission statements. Under the leadership of Dr. Reynaldo B. Vea, Mapúa President and CEO, and former MCL President and CEO, were the following members from Mapúa, namely: Milagros V. Reyes, former Mapúa Executive Vice President for Administration and Chief Operating Officer; Dodjie S. Maestrecampo, Ph.D., then Executive Vice President for Academic Affairs; Engr. Dennis H. Tablante, Dean of the School of EE-ECE-CoE; Engr. Christopher F. dela Rosa, Director of Mapúa’s Development Office for Information Technology; and Raoul A. Villegas, Controller of the Mapúa IT Center.

In November 2006, the Commission on Higher Education (CHED) gave the approval for MCL to offer eight (8) programs of study in Engineering, Information Technology, and Business. This was after MCL’s satisfactory compliance with the standards of the CHED’s Regional Quality Assurance Team.

MCL started with over 860 freshmen students during its first year of operations. Its first two buildings were named after two significant personalities: Dr. Jose P. Rizal and Enrique T. Yuchengco.

Three (3) colleges were initially established under MCL: the Mapúa Institute of Technology at Laguna (MITL), the E.T. Yuchengco College of Business (ETYCB), and the College of Information Technology, which was later renamed as the College of Computer and Information Science (CCIS). The College of Arts and Science (CAS) and the Mapúa-PTC College of Maritime Education and Training (Mapúa-PTC CMET) were eventually added, followed by the Institute for Excellence in Continuing Education and Lifelong Learning (I-ExCELL). MCL’s most recent undertaking is the establishment and opening of MCL Senior High School, its response to the implementation of K-12 in basic education. To shelter the institution’s growing community, the Albert Einstein Building was recently constructed, named after the scientist who, in his lifetime’s work, exuded MCL’s motto: Excellence and Virtue.

Today, MCL offers college programs catering to the fields of engineering, architecture, business, information technology, multimedia arts, tourism management, and maritime education, along with two (2) fully online degree programs. Under MCL Senior High School, four (4) strands are offered under the Academic and Technical-Vocational-Livelihood Tracks. Certification programs are also offered under the Institute of Excellence in Continuing Education and Lifelong Learning (I-ExCELL).

In 2023, it was renamed to Mapúa Malayan Colleges Laguna.

References

External links
Malayan Colleges Laguna Official Website
Mapúa University

Educational institutions established in 2006
MCL
Education in Cabuyao
Mapúa University
2006 establishments in the Philippines